Madhuri Bhattacharya is an Indian actress and former model who has appeared in Kannada and Bollywood films.

Early life
Born in Bangalore in a Bengali family, Bhattacharya studied at the Army Public School and later went to Mount Carmel College to study psychology and Ramaiah College to study law. She lived in R.T. Nagar, Bangalore with her parents, before moving to Mumbai to pursue modelling. She won several beauty contests including the Miss Bangalore title before embarking on her film career. She is now married to a businessman Anurag Arya.

Career
Bhattacharya started her film career by appearing in the Kannada films Khushi and Bisi Bisi. She also modelled for two videos of Sonu Nigam from his album Neene Bari Neene. She acted in Sahara One's television series Kuchh Love Kuchh Masti which was the Indian adaptation of the popular series Sex and the City. In 2009, she appeared in two Bollywood films, Bachelor Party and 3 Nights 4 Days. Her first full fledge role came in the 2010 comedy, Prem Kaa Game alongside Arbaaz Khan. In 2011, she featured in the popular item song "Tinku Jiya" alongside Dharmendra and Bobby Deol in the film Yamla Pagla Deewana. She has completed her third Kannada film Prasad, in which she plays the mother of a deaf-mute eight-year-old boy.

Filmography

See also 
 Unnati Davara

References

External links
 

Living people
Actresses in Hindi cinema
Indian film actresses
Indian voice actresses
Actresses in Kannada cinema
21st-century Indian actresses
Bengali actresses
Actresses from Bangalore
Actresses in Punjabi cinema
Female models from Bangalore
Year of birth missing (living people)